Guzet-Neige is a ski resort situated in the Haute-Ariège area of the Ariège department in the French Pyrénées. The climb to the ski station has been used three times as a stage finish in the Tour de France.

Location

The resort is divided into three areas:
Guzet 1400
Prat-Mataou
Le Freychet

The resort can be accessed from two directions: from the west through the Ustou valley and east through the Col de Latrape from Aulus-les-Bains.

Facilities
The resort features a snowpark.

Cycling

Details of the climb
The climb starts from the village of Seix on the River Salat and shares most of its route with that to the Col de Latrape from where there is a turn-off onto the D68,  from the summit. From here there is a further  climb to the ski station. Over this distance, you climb  at an average gradient of 4.3%, although the final section averages about 8%.

Tour de France stage finishes
The climb to the ski station has been used three times as a stage finish in the Tour de France, most recently in 1995. It is ranked a first category climb.

References

External links
Official website
 Information on Guzet-Neige

Ski stations in France
Sports venues in Ariège (department)